Vincent Schippers (born 4 March 2001) is a Dutch professional footballer who plays as a right-back for Dordrecht.

Club career
A youth product of Sparta Rotterdam, Schippers signed with Schippers made his professional debut with Willem II in a 4-1 Eredivisie loss to Feyenoord on 4 October 2020.

On 10 August 2022, Schippers signed a two-year contract with Dordrecht.

References

External links

Ons Oranje U16 Profile
Ons Oranje U18 Profile
 Career stats & Profile - Voetbal International

2001 births
Living people
People from Vlaardingen
Association football midfielders
Dutch footballers
Netherlands youth international footballers
Sparta Rotterdam players
Willem II (football club) players
FC Dordrecht players
Eredivisie players
Footballers from South Holland